Christopher Joshua Hyslop (born 1987) is a Canadian folk singer-songwriter, signed to Nettwerk Records. Hyslop released his debut EP, Cold Wind, on Nettwerk in 2011.

His first full-length debut album Where the Mountain Meets the Valley, was released on July 3, 2012, to much critical acclaim. A preview single, "What Have I Done?", was released in March 2012.

He spent the better part of 2012–2014 touring and writing his next record. Some of the album was written in Nashville, then finished back in Canada; he released his full-length record In Deepest Blue on October 23, 2015.

Hyslop's third album Echos was released on February 23, 2018.

After touring around Canada for a month in early 2020, Hyslop released an EP titled Embers on February the same year. Hyslop's fourth album Ash & Stone was released on September 11, 2020.

Discography

Studio albums

Extended plays

Singles

References

External links
Joshua Hyslop

Canadian male singer-songwriters
Canadian folk singer-songwriters
Canadian pop singers
Musicians from Saskatoon
Musicians from Vancouver
Living people
1987 births
Canadian folk-pop singers
21st-century Canadian male singers
Nettwerk Music Group artists